Naomi Hartley (born 12 January 2001) is an English footballer who plays as a defender for Sheffield United in the FA Women's Championship. Hartley previously played for Manchester United and Coventry United, and spent time in the youth ranks of Burnley, Blackburn Rovers, Liverpool. She has been capped for England at youth level. Hartley is openly lesbian and worked alongside the Community Foundation's Empower LGBT+ programme in 2022.

Club career

Youth career 
Hartley came through the youth ranks of hometown team Burnley and local rivals Blackburn before joining Manchester United's Centre of Excellence aged 13. After three years at the academy, but with no prospect of progression as United had no senior women's team at the time, Hartley joined Liverpool where she played with experienced England international Casey Stoney, who would later become Hartley's manager.

Liverpool 
Hartley made her senior debut and only appearance for Liverpool on 18 February 2018, in a Women's FA Cup fifth round tie against Chichester City.

Manchester United 
In 2018, Hartley was one of seven former Manchester United W.F.C. players to rejoin the club for their inaugural season in the FA Women's Championship. She was also one of nine players to have played alongside Casey Stoney, who was set to undertake her first managerial role as Manchester United W.F.C.'s head coach.

On 23 September, Hartley made her debut for the club when appearing as a 75th-minute substitute in a league game against London Bees. She made her first start away to Lewes on 2 December. On 8 March, she was loaned to fellow Championship side Sheffield United until the end of the season. She was released at the end of the season.

Sheffield United 
Following an initial loan spell, Hartley signed for Sheffield United permanently ahead of the 2019–20 season. She made her debut in their opening game on 18 August 2019, playing the full 90 minutes in a 3–2 away loss against Aston Villa.

International career 
Hartley captained the England Under-17's during 2018 UEFA Women's Under-17 Championship qualification. In May 2018 she travelled to Lithuania as part of the squad to compete in the finals as the team reached the semi-finals. In February 2019, she was called up to the England Under-19's to take part in the La Manga tournament.

Career statistics

Club

References

External links 
 Profile at the Sheffield United F.C. website
 
 

2001 births
Living people
English women's footballers
Manchester United W.F.C. players
Sheffield United W.F.C. players
Women's association football defenders
Footballers from Burnley
Liverpool F.C. Women players
Women's Super League players
Coventry United W.F.C. players
Women's Championship (England) players
English LGBT sportspeople
LGBT association football players